Draftee Daffy is a 1945 Warner Bros. Looney Tunes cartoon directed by Bob Clampett. The cartoon was released on January 27, 1945, and stars Daffy Duck.

The film depicts Daffy as a draft dodger, who desperately tries to avoid an agent of the draft board. Part of the film is set in hell, but Daffy is unable to end this pursuit.

Plot
Having read about the United States Armed Forces pushing the Nazi German troops back during World War II ("A smashing frontal attack on the enemy rear?"), Daffy Duck is in a patriotic mood. However, his mood quickly changes to fear when he gets a phone call that "the little man from the draft board" wants to see him. Hiding in his house, Daffy looks out, eventually seeing the little man, who attempts to hand him a telegram (presumably with Daffy's conscription order). Daffy starts whining, and continues to try to outrun the little man, who seems to be everywhere that Daffy happens to be at the moment. Daffy even goes so far as to plant a bomb near the man. Finally, he locks him in a safe, bricks the safe up, puts up a wall over the bricks (chortling: "So long, Dracula!"), runs to the roof and takes off in a rocket.

However, the rocket soon plunges back to earth, causing Daffy to crash-land in Hell without Daffy actually saying the word. Shrugging off this turn, Daffy spots a demon (seen from the rear) and tells him: "Oh well, anyway, I sure put one over on that dope from the draft board!" The demon takes off his mask to reveal that he is the man from the draft board, who then replies with a popular catchphrase of the "Richard Q. Peavey" character from The Great Gildersleeve: "Well, now, I wouldn’t say that" (same as what Bugs Bunny says at the end of The Old Grey Hare and which he said over and over again) and proceeds to chase Daffy into the distance, letter still in hand, at iris out.

Reception
Animation historian Jerry Beck writes that in this film, Clampett "gives Daffy Duck the first nuance to his zany personality—something Chuck Jones would expand upon in later shorts—by making the duck an out-and-out coward. Even funnier, the little man from the draft board is portrayed by a nerdy 4F reject, who personifies government intrusion in our lives."

Home media
 VHS, LaserDisc - Cartoon Moviestars: Bugs & Daffy: The Wartime Cartoons
 LaserDisc - The Golden Age of Looney Tunes, Vol. 2, Side 5: Bob Clampett
 VHS - Looney Tunes: The Collectors Edition Volume 7: Welcome To Wackyland (USA 1995 Turner print)
 DVD - Looney Tunes Golden Collection: Volume 3, Disc Four (with optional audio commentary by Eddie Fitzgerald and John Kricfalusi)
 Blu-ray, DVD - Looney Tunes Platinum Collection: Volume 3, Disc 2

References

External links

 
 
 Draftee Daffy on the Internet Archive 

1945 films
1945 animated films
1945 short films
1940s Warner Bros. animated short films
American World War II propaganda shorts
Daffy Duck films
Films directed by Bob Clampett
Looney Tunes shorts
Films scored by Carl Stalling
Draft evasion
Films set in hell